Bartleman is a surname. Notable people with the surname include:

Frank Bartleman (1871–1936), American Pentecostal writer, evangelist, and missionary
James Bartleman (singer) (1769–1821), English bass singer
James Bartleman (born 1939), Canadian former diplomat and author
Robin Bartleman (born 1972), American politician and educator